The Eleventh Commandment is a 1918 American silent drama film directed by Ralph Ince and starring Lucille Lee Stewart, Grace Reals and Carleton Macy.

Cast
 Lucille Lee Stewart as Dora Chester 
 Grace Reals as Mrs. Chester 
 Carleton Macy as Dr. David Mayo
 Walter Miller as Kenneth Royce 
 Huntley Gordon as Robert Stanton

References

Bibliography
 Monaco, James. The Encyclopedia of Film. Perigee Books, 1991.

External links
 

1918 films
1918 drama films
1910s English-language films
American silent feature films
Silent American drama films
American black-and-white films
Films directed by Ralph Ince
1910s American films